Christine  Manie (born 4 May 1984) is a Cameroonian footballer who plays as a defender for French club Yzeure and the Cameroon women's national football team. At the 2014 African Women's Championship, Manie scored an extra-time winner in the semi-final against the Ivory Coast, which brought Cameroon to their first-ever FIFA Women's World Cup.

Honours 
FK Minsk
 Belarusian Women's Cup: 2011

CFF Olimpia Cluj
 Romanian Superliga: 2012–13, 2013–14, 2014–15
 Romanian Women's Cup: 2013, 2014, 2015

References

External links 
 
 
 Profile at soccerdonna.de 
 

1984 births
Living people
Footballers from Yaoundé
Cameroonian women's footballers
Women's association football forwards
FCU Olimpia Cluj players
FC Minsk (women) players
Cameroon women's international footballers
2015 FIFA Women's World Cup players
2019 FIFA Women's World Cup players
Olympic footballers of Cameroon
Footballers at the 2012 Summer Olympics
African Games silver medalists for Cameroon
African Games medalists in football
Competitors at the 2015 African Games
Cameroonian expatriate women's footballers
Expatriate women's footballers in Romania
Cameroonian expatriate sportspeople in Romania
Expatriate women's footballers in Belarus
Cameroonian expatriate sportspeople in Belarus
20th-century Cameroonian women
21st-century Cameroonian women